Adaptive quadrature is a numerical integration method in which the integral of a function  is approximated using static quadrature rules on adaptively refined subintervals of the region of integration. Generally, adaptive algorithms are just as efficient and effective as traditional algorithms for "well behaved" integrands, but are also effective for "badly behaved" integrands for which traditional algorithms may fail.

General scheme
Adaptive quadrature follows the general scheme

 1. procedure integrate ( f, a, b, τ )
 2.     
 3.     
 4.     if ε > τ then
 5.         m = (a + b) / 2
 6.         Q = integrate(f, a, m, τ/2) + integrate(f, m, b, τ/2)
 7.     endif
 8.     return Q

If the estimated error is larger than the required tolerance (line 4), the interval is subdivided (line 5) and the quadrature is applied on both halves separately (line 6). Either the initial estimate or the sum of the recursively computed halves is returned (line 7).

The important components are the quadrature rule itself

the error estimator

and the logic for deciding which interval to subdivide, and when to terminate.

There are several variants of this scheme. The most common will be discussed later.

Basic rules
The quadrature rules generally have the form

where the nodes  and weights  are generally precomputed.

In the simplest case, Newton–Cotes formulas of even degree are used, where the nodes  are evenly spaced in the interval:

When such rules are used, the points at which  has been evaluated can be re-used upon recursion:

A similar strategy is used with Clenshaw–Curtis quadrature, where the nodes are chosen as

Or, when Fejér quadrature is used,

Other quadrature rules, such as Gaussian quadrature or Gauss-Kronrod quadrature, may also be used.

An algorithm may elect to use different quadrature methods on different subintervals, for example using a high-order method only where the integrand is smooth.

Error estimation
Some quadrature algorithms generate a sequence of results which should approach the correct value. Otherwise one can use a "null rule" which has the form of the above quadrature rule, but whose value would be zero for a simple integrand (for example, if the integrand were a polynomial of the appropriate degree).

See:
 Richardson extrapolation (see also Romberg's method)
 Null rules
 Epsilon algorithm

Subdivision logic
"Local" adaptive quadrature makes the acceptable error for a given interval proportional to the length of that interval. This criterion can be difficult to satisfy if the integrands are badly behaved at only a few points, for example with a few step discontinuities.  Alternatively, one could require only that the sum of the errors on each of the subintervals be less than the user's requirement. This would be "global" adaptive quadrature. Global adaptive quadrature can be more efficient (using fewer evaluations of the integrand) but is generally more complex to program and may require more working space to record information on the current set of intervals.

See also
 Adaptive numerical differentiation
 Adaptive step size in ODE
 Adaptive Simpson's method for an example of adaptive quadrature
 QUADPACK, a FORTRAN library that uses global adaptive quadrature

Notes

References
 
 John R. Rice. A Metalgorithm for Adaptive Quadrature.  Journal of the ACM 22(1) pp 61-82 (January 1975).
 

Numerical integration (quadrature)